Harry Flam (born 1948) is a professor of international economics at the Institute for International Economic Studies at Stockholm University. During the years of 2004 and 2006, he was Dean of the School of Business at Stockholm University. His main area of research is international trade and European economic integration. Flam resides in Stockholm, Sweden. He is the father of comedian Aron Flam.

References

1948 births
Swedish economists
Jewish scientists
Living people
Swedish Jews
Academic staff of Stockholm University
Scientists from Stockholm